"Jupiter" is a song by the band Earth, Wind & Fire that was issued as a single in April 1978 on Columbia Records. The single rose to No. 26 on the UK Blues & Soul Top British Soul Singles chart and No. 41 on the UK Pop Singles chart.

Overview
Jupiter was written by EWF leader Maurice White and Verdine White, Larry Dunn and Phillip Bailey. The single's b-side was a song called Runnin'. Both Jupiter and Runnin' came off the band's 1977 studio album All 'N All.

Critical reception
Alex Henderson of Allmusic noted that on Jupiter EWF are "tearing into the hardest of funk".

Chart positions

References

1978 singles
Earth, Wind & Fire songs
Songs written by Maurice White
Songs written by Philip Bailey
Songs written by Verdine White
Songs written by Larry Dunn
1978 songs
Columbia Records singles